Gz II Godz is the sixth studio album by American hip hop duo G-Side. It was released by Slow Motion Soundz on May 15, 2014. The cover art is designed by John Turner Jr.

Critical reception

Brandon Soderberg of Spin gave the album an 8 out of 10, calling it "quintessential G-Side: tragically optimistic trappers trying to make good when they’ve been handed a fairly garbage hand." David Turner of Pitchfork gave the album a 7.2 out of 10, commenting that "Honesty has always been located at the core of G-Side's music, but they remain striving nonetheless, and Gz II Godz is the work of a duo that have only gotten wiser since they last rhymed together." Samantha O'Connor of Exclaim! wrote, "In an era drowning in 808s and synths, the diverse project is an invigorating buffet, proving that the pair knows who they are sonically but aren't afraid to experiment."

Stereogum placed it at number 20 on the "40 Best Rap Albums of 2014" list.

Track listing

References

External links
 

2014 albums
G-Side albums